In the Uncommon Market is a live album by American pianist, composer and bandleader Duke Ellington recorded in Europe in 1963 and 1966 and released on the Pablo label in 1986.

Reception
The Allmusic review by Richard S. Ginell awarded the album 4½ stars and stated ""In the Uncommon Market," of course, refers to Europe, where Norman Granz caught the Ellington band numerous times with his tape machines in the 1960s. But it could also refer to the unusual repertoire featured on this collection."

Track listing
All compositions by Duke Ellington except as indicated
 "Bula" - 4:44  
 "Silk Lace" - 5:18  
 "Asphalt Jungle" - 4:05  
 "Star-Crossed Lovers" (Ellington, Billy Strayhorn) - 4:19  
 "In a Sentimental Mood" (Ellington, Manny Kurtz, Irving Mills) - 3:47  
 "E.S.P." - 5:52  
 "Guitar Amour" - 7:35  
 "The Shepherd (First Concept)" - 5:33  
 "The Shepherd (Second Concept)" - 6:35  
 "Kinda Dukish" - 4:21
Recorded in Stockholm, Sweden on February 6 or 7, 1963 (tracks 1-3 & 7), in Milan, Italy on February 21, 1963 (tracks 4-6) and  Saint-Paul-de-Vence, France on July 27, 1966 (tracks 8-10).

Personnel
Duke Ellington – piano
Cat Anderson, Roy Burrowes, Cootie Williams - trumpet (tracks 1-7)
Ray Nance - trumpet, violin (tracks 1-7)
Lawrence Brown, Buster Cooper - trombone (tracks 1-7)
Chuck Connors - bass trombone (tracks 1-7)
Russell Procope - alto saxophone, clarinet (tracks 1-7)
Johnny Hodges - alto saxophone (tracks 1-7)
Jimmy Hamilton - clarinet, tenor saxophone (tracks 1-7)
Paul Gonsalves - tenor saxophone (tracks 1-7)
Harry Carney - baritone saxophone, clarinet, bass clarinet (tracks 1-7)
Ernie Shephard (tracks 1-7), John Lamb (tracks 8-10) - bass
Sam Woodyard - drums

References

Duke Ellington live albums
1986 live albums
albums produced by Norman Granz
Pablo Records live albums